Thailand's Got Talent season 5 (also known as TGT) was the fifth season of the Thailand's Got Talent reality television series on the Channel 3 television network, and part of the global British Got Talent series. It is a talent show that features singers, dancers, sketch artists, comedians and other performers of all ages competing for the advertised top prize of 10,000,000 Baht (approximately $325,000). The show debuted in June 2015. Thailand is also the fifth country in Asia to license Got Talent series. The four judges Chalatit Tantiwut, Patcharasri Benjamad, Pornchita Na Songkla and Nitipong Hornak join hosts Ketsepsawat Palagawongse na Ayutthaya.

Broadcast 
 Audition  6 weeks.
 DO-MORE Week  1 week.
 Semi-final  5 weeks.
 Final  1 week.

Semi-finals

Semi-finalists

{|
|-
|  ||| Golden buzzer
|}

Semi-final 1 (26 July)

Semi-final 2 (2 August)

Semi-final 3 (9 August)

Semi-final 4 (16 August)

Semi-final 5 (23 August)

Finals

Thailand's Got Talent seasons
2015 Thai television seasons